Tiapamil (INN; also known as dimeditiapramine) is a calcium antagonist or calcium channel blocker. It is an experimental drug that has never been marketed.

Tiapamil has been described as an antianginal agent. It exhibits properties of anti-arrhythmic medications. These are medications that are used to treat unusually fast or irregular heartbeats. Examples of arrhytmthic conditions include atrial fibrillation, atrial flutter, and super-ventricular tachycardia. Upon research, the drug shows promising effects on treatment of these condition. Research seeks to create a treatment with tiapamil in order to mitigate the side effects of the more commonly prescribed calcium antagonist and anti-hypertensive verapamil. The two drugs have similar properties; however, tiapamil appears to treat arrhythmic conditions without many of the hypotensive, negative inotropic, and negative chronotropic side effects. Tiapamil is a calcium channel blocker that acts on the slow calcium channels. It can treat ventricular arrhythmias to a higher degree than traditional calcium antagonists.

See also 
 Verapamil

References 

Antianginals
Calcium channel blockers
Catechol ethers
Dithianes
Phenethylamines